Minturn is a home rule municipality in Eagle County, Colorado, United States. The town population was 1,027 at the 2010 United States Census.

Geography
Minturn is located in southeastern Eagle County on the Eagle River between the resort communities of Vail and Beaver Creek. US 24 leads south  over the Continental Divide at Tennessee Pass to Leadville.

Minturn is surrounded on three sides by White River National Forest, with the Holy Cross Wilderness bordering the southwest side of the town. The national forest offers hiking, biking, snowshoeing, cross country skiing, and other recreational opportunities. Five huts operated by the Tenth Mountain Hut Association along with their associated trail systems are found in the local Eagle-Holy Cross ranger district. Camp Hale, a World War II winter training site now on the National Register of Historic Places, is situated toward the south end of the district.

The Holy Cross District lies on the northern extent of the Sawatch Range and the western flank of the Gore Range. It includes the forest areas surrounding the towns of Vail, Minturn, Red Cliff and Avon. To the north, the district takes in much of the Piney River and Sheephorn Creek drainages.

The upper Eagle River provides a variety of scenic, outdoor recreation opportunities along its 20+ mile stretch from Tennessee Pass to Dowd Junction. For river enthusiasts, fishing, rafting, kayaking and canoeing are plentiful. Floating season generally occurs from late May through July. Access to the river is available from several public access points along Highway 24.

Demographics

As of the census of 2000, there were 1,068 people, 399 households, and 244 families residing in the town. The racial makeup of the town was 83.33% White, 0.28% African American, 2.81% Native American, 0.09% Asian, 0.47% Pacific Islander, 11.80% from other races, and 1.22% from two or more races. Hispanic or Latino of any race were 44.48% of the population.

There were 399 households, out of which 27.3% had children under the age of 18 living with them, 48.9% were married couples living together, 7.5% had a female householder with no husband present, and 38.6% were non-families. 20.1% of all households were made up of individuals, and 1.8% had someone living alone who was 65 years of age or older. The average household size was 2.68 and the average family size was 3.14.

In the town, the population was spread out, with 20.2% under the age of 18, 12.8% from 18 to 24, 43.2% from 25 to 44, 18.5% from 45 to 64, and 5.2% who were 65 years of age or older. The median age was 32 years. For every 100 females, there were 116.2 males. For every 100 females age 18 and over, there were 121.9 males.

The median income for a household in the town was $51,736, and the median income for a family was $53,750. Males had a median income of $32,350 versus $26,750 for females. The per capita income for the town was $23,135. About 4.3% of families and 5.4% of the population were below the poverty line, including 5.9% of those under age 18 and 3.2% of those age 65 or over.

History
The town is named for Robert Bowne Minturn, Jr., who was vice president of the Denver and Rio Grande Western Railroad that founded the town. He was also a member of Grinnell, Minturn & Co.

Minturn's oldest families settled at the confluence of Gore Creek and the Eagle River in the late 1800s. Some created homesteads and farmed the land, while others mined silver in the mountains high above town. With the arrival of the Denver & Rio Grande Railroad in 1887, Minturn quickly developed into a booming crossroads for transportation and industry. By the turn of the century, a growing population of mining and railroad workers and their families raised the demand for business and services in town. In response, Minturn was incorporated on November 15, 1904.

Minturn has adapted to several major changes in the local economy over the decades, including the development of Vail and Beaver Creek ski resorts, the closing of the Gilman mine, and the abandonment of rail lines through Minturn. Despite this transformation from the Old West to the new, Minturn maintains its distinctive character, architecture and quality of life.

Transportation
Minturn is served by Eagle County Regional Airport near Gypsum,  to the west.

Eagle County provides bus service from the Dowd Junction Transit Stop with service to Minturn, Vail, Leadville, Eagle-Vail, Avon, Beaver Creek, Edwards, Eagle, Gypsum and Dotsero.

Interstate 70 runs east–west two miles north of Minturn. Highway 24 runs east–west through Minturn, and to the east leading to the towns of Red Cliff and eventually Leadville.

See also

Outline of Colorado
Index of Colorado-related articles
State of Colorado
Colorado cities and towns
Colorado municipalities
Colorado counties
Eagle County, Colorado
List of statistical areas in Colorado

References

External links

Town of Minturn official website
CDOT map of the Town of Minturn

Towns in Eagle County, Colorado
Towns in Colorado
1904 establishments in Colorado
Populated places established in 1904